Semigenetta is an extinct genus of viverrid. It lived in Europe, China and Thailand in the Miocene, and was very similar to the extant genus Genetta, but lacked a molar that Genetta still possesses.

References

Viverrids
Miocene feliforms
Prehistoric carnivoran genera